The 1974 Federation Cup was the 12th edition of the most important competition between national teams in women's tennis. 29 nations participated in the tournament, which was held at the Naples Tennis Club in Naples, Italy, from 13–19 May. Australia defended their title, defeating United States in the final, in what was the fifth final featuring both United States and Australia.

Participating teams

Draw
All ties were played at the Naples Tennis Club in Naples, Italy, on clay courts.

First round

Italy vs. Belgium

 This match currently holds the record for the most games in a Fed Cup doubles set (pre-tiebreak).

Indonesia vs. Israel

Great Britain vs. Ireland

Chile vs. Norway

Romania vs. Argentina

Denmark vs. Sweden

New Zealand vs. Spain

Canada vs. West Germany

Netherlands vs. France

Philippines vs. Austria

Luxembourg vs. Poland

Second round

Australia vs. Japan

Italy vs. Israel

Great Britain vs. Norway

Switzerland vs. South Africa

Romania vs. Sweden

Spain vs. West Germany

France vs. Austria

Poland vs. United States

Quarterfinals

Australia vs. Italy

Great Britain vs. South Africa

Romania vs. West Germany

France vs. United States

Semifinals

Australia vs. Great Britain

West Germany vs. United States

Final

Australia vs. United States

Consolation Round
Teams which lost in the first or second round of the main draw went on to play in the Consolation Round.

Draw

First round

Luxembourg vs. Austria

Philippines vs. Sweden

Switzerland vs. Poland

Second round

Israel vs. Norway

New Zealand vs. Argentina

Spain vs. Indonesia

Belgium vs. Austria

Sweden vs. Poland

Chile vs. Japan

Denmark vs. Canada

Ireland vs. Netherlands

Quarterfinals

Norway vs. Argentina

Indonesia vs. Belgium

Poland vs. Japan

Canada vs. Netherlands

Semifinals

Argentina vs. Belgium

Japan vs. Netherlands

Final

Argentina vs. Japan

References

Billie Jean King Cups by year
Federation
Tennis tournaments in Italy
Sport in Naples
Federation Cup
Federation Cup
Federation Cup, 1974
Federation Cup